Trnjava is a settlement east of Lukovica pri Domžalah in the eastern part of the Upper Carniola region of Slovenia.

References

External links

Trnjava on Geopedia

Populated places in the Municipality of Lukovica